Opel Eisenach GmbH (formerly Opel AWE Planungs GmbH) is a German manufacturing company based at Eisenach in Thuringia, Germany and a subsidiary of Opel. It currently produces the Opel Grandland

History 

In March 1990 Adam Opel AG and Automobilwerk Eisenach (AWE) (at that time best known in the west as the producer of the Wartburg) concluded a collaboration agreement.  Things moved fast, and on 5 October 1990, AWE and Opel together opened an assembly line for the Opel Vectra.   Guests at the accompanying celebrations included Helmut Kohl, who two days earlier had become the first Chancellor of a newly reunified Germany.

A further agreement was signed on 13 December 1990, this time between Treuhand president Detlev Rohwedder, Opel Chairman Louis R. Hughes and (AWE) directors, for the purchase of land in the  Gries business park, to the west of the Wartburgstadt, where a new car assembly plant could be built.   A foundation stone for the new plant was laid on 7 February 1991 and, once the roof was on the building, a "Topping out" ceremony was held on 9 September 1991.  At the same time the existing (AWE) plant was closed and production there of the Wartburg 1.3 (a short-lived re-engined version of the Wartburg 353) was ended.

Construction of the new Eisenach plant involved Opel in an investment of about a Million Marks.

Production started on September, 23rd 1992 at the Eisenach Opel plant, with the Opel Corsa and Opel Astra models. Employing just 1,900 people at this time, the facility was described as the most successful and productive auto-plant in Europe.

The introduction of a third shift on 4 October 1993 marked the end of the plant's start-up phase. On 16 October 1996 Eisenach notched up production of half a million Opels, and the millionth car came off the line on 16 November 1999.

The well publicized bankruptcy of General Motors, its parent company, placed Opel's future ownership and indeed its survival in question for several months during 2009, and this also impacted the Eisenach facility where, at times, production was halted.

Products
Since 1993, Opel Eisenach has been producing the Opel Corsa. Between 1990 and 2009 the plant produced 2.5 million vehicles. In 2010, Opel decided to build its new city car at the Thuringian production plant, and the Opel Adam duly appeared in January 2013. Production of both Corsa E and Adam ended in May 2019 and since August 2019, the Eisenach factory is producing the Opel Grandland in both regular and PHEV version.

See also
 Opel
 Opel Special Vehicles
 Opel Performance Center

References

External links

Eisenach Plant. Facts and Figures 

Opel factories
Vehicle manufacturing companies established in 1990
Car manufacturers of Germany
Eisenach